Patrick Jerry Lyons (March 1860 – January 20, 1914)  was a  Major League Baseball player. Lyons played for the Cleveland Spiders in the 1890 season as a second baseman.

Lyons was born in Belleville, Ontario and died in Springfield, Ohio.

Professional career
He played for Dayton again in  before being purchased by the Spiders.

Lyons played in 11 games in his one-year career. He had a .053 batting average, with two hits in 38 at bats. He batted and threw right-handed.

External links

1860 births
1914 deaths
19th-century baseball players
Baseball people from Ontario
Canadian expatriate baseball players in the United States
Cleveland Spiders players
Major League Baseball second basemen
Major League Baseball players from Canada
Sportspeople from Belleville, Ontario
Springfield, Ohio (minor league baseball) players
Hamilton (minor league baseball) players
Dayton Reds players
Meadville (minor league baseball) players
Quincy Ravens players
Johnstown Terrors players
Staunton Hayseeds players
Newport News-Hampton Deckhands players
Petersburg Farmers players